Fahaheel Stadium or Nayif Al-Dabbous Stadium is a multi-use stadium in Fahaheel, Kuwait. It is currently used mostly for football matches and is the home stadium of Al Fahaheel.  This stadium is the second smallest(2000 seats) in the country, and is known for the street fights that litter the alleyways around it.  Although this location may not be the safest, it always has a great turnout of fans and is a spectacular place to get a sense of cultural immersion.

Football venues in Kuwait